Catalina Air Lines was a seaplane airline founded in 1940 as Catalina Air Transport, and was based in Long Beach, California.

History
In 1953, it became Avalon Air Transport, named after the city of Avalon, California, located on Santa Catalina Island (California). In 1963, it became Catalina Air Lines.  The airline was acquired by Golden West Airlines in 1969 which then operated seaplane flights as Catalina Golden West.

Catalina Air Lines served Catalina Airport in Avalon, California on Santa Catalina Island with flights to several locations on the southern California mainland including Long Beach Airport (LGB) in Long Beach, California and the Catalina Air Terminal located at the Long Beach Harbor.

There were also several other air carriers that used the name "Catalina Airlines" and served Santa Catalina Island with scheduled passenger flights including Catalina Airlines with flights operated with de Havilland Dove piston engine twin prop aircraft from the Catalina Airport as well as another Catalina Airlines which operated turbine powered Sikorsky S-58T and Sikorsky S-62 helicopters.

Fleet
Catalina operated the following amphibious seaplane aircraft:
Grumman G-21 Goose
Sikorsky S-43
Sikorsky VS-44A

See also 
 List of defunct airlines of the United States

References

Defunct regional airlines of the United States
Santa Catalina Island (California)
Transportation in Los Angeles County, California
Companies based in Los Angeles County, California
American companies established in 1940 
Airlines established in 1940 
Airlines disestablished in 1969
1940 establishments in California
1969 disestablishments in California
Defunct companies based in Greater Los Angeles
Golden West Airlines
Defunct seaplane operators
1969 mergers and acquisitions
Airlines based in California
Defunct airlines of the United States